MCM Worldwide  is a luxury fashion brand originally founded in 1976 as the initialism of "Michael Cromer Munich".  The brand’s signature logo-printed material, called Cognac Visetos, appears on many of its products.  Its brass plate insignia is found on all heritage collection bags and most products; each brass plate is identified by a unique number at the bottom. MCM sells its products through wholesale accounts, franchises and directly operated stores. 
The brand was bought out by Sungjoo Group of Korea in 2005.

History 
The MCM label, originally stood  popular during the 1980s for being "ostentatious and flashy". At the height of its popularity in 1993, it owned 250 branches worldwide and recorded sales of $250 million. Following a 1995 investigation of Cromer for alleged tax evasion by German tax authorities, banks and investors lost faith in MCM's financial stability. In 1997, the company was restructured, and its stores and trademark rights were split and sold.

In 2005, the worldwide rights to the MCM brand were acquired from a Swiss financier by Sungjoo Group, a South Korean retail business founded by Sung-Joo Kim, the youngest daughter of South Korean magnate Kim Soo-Keon. At the time, MCM's global sales stood at $100 million. Kim hired designer Michael Michalsky and re-launched the brand in 2006 with a new store in Berlin. MCM thereafter reopened stores in New York, Toronto, Paris, London, Singapore, Tokyo, and China among others. In 2011, MCM debuted its largest store in Hong Kong’s Entertainment Building.

MCM makes roughly 70% of its sales in Asia, and roughly 30% in Europe, the Middle East, and the Americas. The brand aimed to have sales of $2 billion by 2019.

Gallery

References

External links 

 

Luggage brands
Luggage manufacturers
Luxury brands
Design companies established in 1976
Manufacturing companies established in 1976
German brands
High fashion brands
Fashion accessory brands
Retail companies of South Korea
Eyewear brands of Germany